The Australian cricket team toured Pakistan in 1998–99. The teams played three 5-day tests and three ODIs. Australia won both the test series (1-0) and the ODI series (3-0). Ijaz Ahmed and Mark Taylor were declared Men of the Series for the Test matches.

Tour Matches

Test

1st Test

2nd Test

3rd Test

ODIs

1st ODI

2nd ODI

3rd ODI

References

External links
 CricketArchive
 ESPNcricinfo
 Playfair Cricket Annual
 Wisden Cricketers' Almanack (annual)

1998 in Australian cricket
1998 in Pakistani cricket
1998-99
Pakistani cricket seasons from 1970–71 to 1999–2000
International cricket competitions from 1997–98 to 2000